Alfred Cotton Bedford Sr. (November 5, 1863 – September 21, 1925) was president of the Standard Oil Company of New Jersey starting on December 22, 1916 to November 15, 1917. He served as chairman of the board of Standard Oil of New Jersey from November 15, 1917 to September 21, 1925.

Biography
He was born on November 5, 1863 in Brooklyn, New York City to Alfred Bedford of England. He married Edith Kinsman Clark on January 8, 1890 and had Alfred Cotton Bedford Jr.

He was promoted from treasurer to president of the Standard Oil Company of New Jersey starting on December 22, 1916. He was made chairman of the board on November 15, 1917 and Walter Clark Teagle took over the presidency.

He was made a Commandant of the Legion in 1922.

He died on September 21, 1925. He left an estate of $3,000,000. He was buried in Green-Wood Cemetery in Brooklyn, New York. His widow died in 1944.

Publications
Problems Confronting the Petroleum Industry

References

1863 births
1925 deaths
Burials at Green-Wood Cemetery
Commandeurs of the Légion d'honneur
Businesspeople from Brooklyn
American businesspeople in the oil industry
19th-century American businesspeople
20th-century American businesspeople